Diana Silva may refer to:

Diana Silva (footballer) (born 1995), Portuguese footballer
Diana Silva (model) (born 1997), Venezuelan model